Leptogryllus deceptor, the Oahu deceptor bush cricket, is a species of cricket in the family Gryllidae. It was endemic to the Pacific island state of Hawaii in the United States. It is considered extinct in the wild according to the International Union for Conservation of Nature.

References

deceptor
Endemic fauna of Hawaii
Insects described in 1910
Taxa named by Robert Cyril Layton Perkins
Taxonomy articles created by Polbot